Power sector of Andhra Pradesh is divided into 4 categories namely Regulation, Generation, Transmission and Distribution. Andhra Pradesh Electricity Regulatory Commission (APERC) is the regulatory body. APGENCO deals with the electricity production and also maintenance, proposes new projects and upgrades existing ones as well. The APGENCO also set up a Special Purpose Vehicle (SPV), named as Andhra Pradesh Power Development Company Limited (APPDCL), a joint venture company of APGENCO (with 50% equity) and IL&FS (50% equity) to set up Krishnapatanam thermal power project (2x800 MW).

APTRANSCO is set up for transmission of power. Power distribution in the state is divided into three divisions, namely Eastern Power Distribution Corporation Limited (APEPDCL), Central Power Distribution Corporation Limited (APCPDCL) and Southern Power Distribution Corporation Limited (APSPDCL), which distributes the power to the households, agriculture and the industries. APGENCO, APPDCL, NTPC and other private firms contribute to the generation of power in the state of Andhra Pradesh. Andhra Pradesh has become the second state in India to achieve 100% electrification of all households.  Weighted average cost of power generation and purchases is INR 3.45 per kWh which is highest in the country. Andhra Pradesh is also leader by installing 433 nos electric vehicle charging stations (EVCS) out of 927 nos installed in the entire country as on 30 June 2020.

Under the program of installing 500 GW capacity of renewable power capacity by 2030, nearly 59 GW (25%) of solar and wind power is identified out of 236.58 GW in three districts of the state.

The newly formed Andhra Pradesh Green Energy Corporation Limited (APGECL), a 100% subsidiary of APGENCO, will be the trading agency/licensee for the 10 GW solar project in a phased manner and for connecting it to the grid. The 10 GW solar projects would be used to meet the entire agriculture power consumption which will be met during the day time for nine hours duration daily. Andhra Pradesh is also leading in installation of solar power /off grid agriculture pump sets. A renewable energy export policy for Andhra Pradesh was also announced to facilitate the setting up of 120 GW solar, wind and solar-wind hybrid energy parks by using 0.5 million acres of land. New & Renewable Energy Development Corporation of Andhra Pradesh (NREDCAP), a state owned company, is actively involved in promoting renewable energy projects in the state. Roof top solar power cost/unit in the state are falling below the domestic power tariff. 

The total installed utility power generation capacity is nearly 24,854 MW in the state as of 31 March 2020  APtransCo has made long term power purchase agreements for 19,068 MW as of 31 March 2019. The per capita electricity consumption is 1234 units with 63,143 million KWh gross electricity supplied in the year 2018–19. The performance of Krishnapatanam thermal power station (2X800 MW) with super critical pressure technology is not satisfactory even after one year commercial operation as the units rarely operate at rated capacity forcing the state to purchase costly power from day ahead trading in IEX.

Short term power purchases 
APDisComs purchase regularly from the energy exchange, etc. to meet the peak load and energy shortages. As the power purchases/sales are done on daily basis without proper planning and optimum utilization of APGENCO power generation capacity, APERC has given guidelines to the DisComs for implementation while making short term (less than one year duration) purchases and sales in the year 2022.

Non-renewable

Thermal power 

Thermal power plants are based on the fuel coal, gas, diesel etc. Public sector undertaking NTPC, state level power generating companies and private firms are engaged in this sector for power generation.

Currently operating coal based thermal power plants in Andhra Pradesh are listed below.

Gas fuel-based 

The following are the list of presently installed combined cycle gas turbine power plants and diesel engine power plants in the state. However many of these power plants are not operating due to non-availability of natural gas and high cost of liquid fuels.

Renewable

Hydroelectric 
This is the list of major hydroelectric power plants in Andhra Pradesh.

Pumped storage hydroelectricity projects
Pumped hydroelectric energy storage (PHES) projects with high water head are the cheap means of converting intermittent renewable power generation sources like solar PV or wind power in to base load supply for round the clock needs throughout the year. AP state is endowed with vast PHES potential adequate to utilise its vast solar PV power generation potential (above 1,000,000 MW installed on 16,000 km2 marginal lands) to meet ultimate green energy requirements of its peak population (60 million). AP is considering on a major scale to install PHES projects to make available the surplus wind / solar power during the peak load hours. PHESs also generate income, in addition to hydroelectricity cess/royalty, to the state in the form of water use charges at commercial rates for the evaporation loss or consumptive water from the reservoirs. The area occupied by the high head PHES is less than the area occupied by the equivalent battery energy storage system (BESS) housed in a three storied building. High head PHES installation cost (< US$40 per KWh) is less than the cost of land and buildings required to house the equivalent BESS. PHES are more suitable in India where energy and water storage needs are complementary. Unlike the static BESS, the rotating turbo-generator of a PHES will enhance dynamic inertia (GD2) of the grid which contributes to a stable grid to ride through the power disturbances when power generation in the grid is dominated by the static solar PV power. Variable speed PHES plants also deliver the power grid ancillary services. In high head PHES, unlined pressure tunnels/shafts are constructed to the extent feasible for reducing construction cost.

The water reservoir of a PHES is created by building embankment dams wherever required up to the required height and length. The rock required for building the dams is excavated from the reservoir area. Cheaper drilling and blasting method is extensively used deploying state of the art earth moving equipment because huge quantity of rock excavation is required for the construction of the rock-fill dams. 

Polavaram right bank PHES:
A 103,000 MW PHES project is under investigation with an upper reservoir, located near Parantapalle hamlet in West Godavari district, with 90 tmcft live storage at 700 m msl full reservoir level (FRL). The turkey-nest type upper reservoir is 18 km long from north to south and 1.1 km wide and its water surface area is 16 km2 with 200 m water depth and nearly 90 tmcft live storage. The adjacent Polavaram reservoir at FRL 45 m msl with 194 tmcft gross storage is the lower reservoir as perennial water source. The average water head available is 600 m with a provision to draw 33 tmcft/day from the Polavaram reservoir by the PHES units located in semi open or underground power houses. Another 33 tmcft is used to compensate the loss of storage capacity in the lower reservoir. This buffer storage is released in to lower reservoir for irrigation, etc. needs once in a year at the end of monsoon year and it is replenished at the earliest from the flood water inflows into the lower reservoir. Also seepage and evaporation losses from the upper reservoir are met from the buffer storage sourced from flood waters and not drawn from the lower reservoir storage. The excess buffer storage maintained in this upper reservoir can also serve up to 24 tmcft for other PHESs in the state which are using Godavari basin water and have no buffer storage of their own (ex: Jalaput PHES). The upper reservoir can be further expanded by 3.5 km length on its south side to enhance the live / buffer storage substantially. The PHES project can produce 412 billion KWh at 4000 hours/year or 12 hours/day operation in generation mode by consuming the surplus power generated from the solar and wind power plants during the day time. This PHES can also moderate the severe floods by utilizing empty volume kept in the lower reservoir or operating in pump mode (maximum 7.63 lakh cusecs) to fill the upper reservoir. In case of emergency / repairs, the entire water storage in the upper reservoir can be emptied safely into the lower reservoir / river within 24 hours by running the PHES in generation mode.
 
Srisailam right bank PHES:
A 77,000 MW PHES project is feasible with an upper reservoir, located on the right bank side within 1000 m distance of Srisailam reservoir, with 87 tmcft live storage at 650 m msl FRL. The reservoir bunds are constructed on 500 m msl contour line by 155 m high and the water surface area of the upper reservoir is nearly 20 km2. The adjacent Srisailam reservoir at FRL 270 m msl  with 185 tmcft live storage is the lower reservoir with perennial water source. The average water head available is 340 m with provision to draw water from the Srisailam reservoir by the PHES units located in semi open or underground power houses. The PHES project can produce 308 billion KWh at 4000 hours/year or 12 hours/day operation in generation mode.  Only 43.5 tmcft (50%) reservoir storage is used for power generation on daily basis and the remaining half kept as buffer storage to compensate the loss of storage in downstream  reservoir due to PHES by releasing water once in a year in to the Srisailam reservoir to meet irrigation water requirements. The buffer storage is replenished later at the earliest during the monsoon/floods. This PHES can also moderate the severe floods by utilizing empty volume kept in the lower reservoir or operating in pump mode (maximum 10 lakh cusecs) to fill the upper reservoir.

Feasible PHES projects

Notes: Power potential (MW) is in generation mode, MDDL→ Minimum Draw Down Level or lowest bed level of the reservoir, FRL→ Full Reservoir Level, m msl→ meters above mean sea level. The total water storage includes nearly 432 tmcft of irrigation components. PHES water storage is 793 tmcft only. The PHES land requirement is nearly 1% of the land required (41,250 km2) for equivalent electricity generation by Solar PV power plants. The power potential doubles in case of pumping operation for six hours in a day for the same water storage.

Solar 

The state is endowed with vast photovoltaic power potential on its marginally productive lands. The state has total installed solar power capacity of 4,116.01 MW as of 30 June 2021.

The state is planning to add 10,050 MW solar power capacity to provide power supply to farming sector during the day time. Out of 10,050 MW, 6,400 MW capacity at 10 sites were offered for bidding. The winning tariffs are Rs 2.50 per unit which are at least 25% more than the earlier awarded tariffs of Rs 2 per unit in November 2020 even after reducing scope of work (no HV transmission line construction outside the solar park), state providing the land on lease, giving state guarantee for the timely payment for the power sold, allowing the state guarantee as security to get financial assistance at lower interest rates, disregarding higher solar power potential at these sites compared to Western and northern regions, etc. The AP high court has stayed the award of contracts to the successful bidders on the grounds that these contracts are excluded from the jurisdiction of APERC in contravention of the electricity act, 2003.

The state has offered five Ultra Mega Solar Power Projects with a total capacity of 12,200 MW to developers under renewable power export policy outside the state.

Wind power 

The state has total installed wind power capacity of 4,083.57 MW as on 30 June 2021.

Other utility power plants 
In addition to above projects, there are nearly 103 MW small Hydro plants, nearly 490 MW bagasse, industrial & municipal waste, bio-mass co-generation,
& bio-mass based power projects, nearly 78.79 mini power plants (grid connected) and nearly 67.20 MW other (grid connected) plants based on isolated gas wells, etc. in private sector. These power plants are not covering captive power capacity in various industries that are not grid connected. In addition, there are innumerable diesel generator sets installed in the state for stand by supply and emergency power supply needs during power outages.

Transmission system 

The state has well spread transmission system. APTransCo / DisComs owned and operated transmission lines from 400 kV to 11 kV is 231,127 circuit kilometers excluding the HT lines owned and operated by PGCIL in the state. For importing and exporting power, the state grid is well interconnected with adjoining western and eastern regional grids in addition to adjoining state grids. The spread of high voltage transmission lines (≥ 11 kV) is such that it can form a square matrix of area 1.93 km2 (i.e. on average, at least one HT line within 0.7 km vicinity) in 160,205 km2 total area of the state. DisComs owned and operated LT lines (below 11 kV) are 292,158 circuit kilometers. It represents that there is at least one HT or LT line availability on average within the vicinity of 306 meters in the entire state area. The state has 3183 nos substations (≥ 33 kV) which represents one substation in every 50.33 km2 area on average (i.e. one substation with in 3.6 km distance on average). However the maximum peak load met is 9,453 MW as of 14 October 2018. Huge installed capacity of the transmission network and the substations are being underutilized with low demand factor.

See also 

 Transmission system performance parameters
 Grid energy storage
 HVDC Sileru–Barsoor
 List of power stations in India
 Electricity sector in India
 Energy policy of India
 List of largest power stations in the world
 States of India by installed power capacity

References

External links 
 Coal based power plants in India on SourceWatch
 Electricity grid maps of southern region

Power stations in Andhra Pradesh
Energy in Andhra Pradesh